Johann Peter Haseney (1812, Mehlis, Saxe-Gotha-Altenburg – 1869, Munich) was a German engraver.

Haseney came to Munich in his young years, where he worked as an engraver with the Seitz company. There he made different designs for stamps. He engraved the first German stamp, the One Kreuzer black (Schwarzer Einser) in the Kingdom of Bavaria, issued on November 1, 1849.

1869 deaths
1812 births
People from Zella-Mehlis
People from Saxe-Gotha-Altenburg
German engravers
German stamp designers
19th-century engravers